State Route 2 (SR 2), formerly known as Inter-county Highway 2 until 1921 and State Highway 2 in 1922, is an east–west highway crossing most of northern Ohio. Its western terminus is at the Indiana state line near Hicksville where the route becomes Indiana State Road 37 which continues to Fort Wayne, Indiana. The eastern terminus of the route is in Painesville Township in Lake County at U.S. Route 20 (US 20).

Route description

It passes through Bryan, Wauseon (where it briefly becomes a couplet), and enters greater Toledo west of its interchange with the Ohio Turnpike. It continues east from greater Toledo and soon parallels Lake Erie, becoming a freeway near Port Clinton. From Toledo to Sandusky the highway is also part of and designated the Lake Erie Circle Tour that is also part of the  "Great Lakes Circle Tour". It then passes Sandusky, where it meets U.S. Route 250 (US 250) and US 6, and separates from the lakeshore as a freeway, and traverses rural Erie County before entering Lorain County. Near Elyria, it joins Interstate 90 (I-90), whose route it shares to Rocky River, where it follows SR 254 along Detroit Road into Lakewood. Here it again joins US 6, as well as US 20 on Clifton Boulevard. It then becomes part of the Cleveland Memorial Shoreway in Cleveland, joining I-90 again near Burke Lakefront Airport. These two highways split near Euclid, and SR 2 continues along the Lakeland Freeway to Painesville, feeding into US 20 eastbound. SR 2 serves as an access route to lakeshore attractions on Lake Erie from Toledo and Cleveland and as an alternative to the Ohio Turnpike.

The stretch of SR 2 from Toledo to Sandusky passes several attractions. The Ottawa National Wildlife Refuge is just east of SR 19 in Carroll Township. It sits on  along with the Davis–Besse Nuclear Power Station.

SR 2 is the lowest numbered state route in Ohio. SR 1 was decommissioned in 1965.

Naming
The section of SR 2 that runs through Erie County is called the "Jackie Mayer Miss America Highway" and is named for Jackie Mayer, a former Miss America who was born and raised in Sandusky.

The section of SR 2 that runs through Willoughby is named "Brian Montgomery Memorial Highway" in honor of a Marine Lance Corporal who was killed in the Iraq War in August 2005.

History

1912: Intercounty Highway 2 runs from Cleveland to the Pennsylvania state line.
1923: Route is extended to follow current US 6 alignment from the Indiana state line to Bryan, and current SR 51 and US 20 from Toledo to the Pennsylvania state line.
Cleveland-to-Pennsylvania alignment certified as US 20.
1931: Extended east to Willoughby along previously unnumbered route (St. Clair).
1931–1932: Western terminus shortened to Bryan, Bryan to Indiana state line certified as US 6
1936: Extended to Indiana state line via the former SR 108 alignment from Hicksville to Bryan, and the former SR 18 alignment from the Indiana state line to Hicksville, with which it was dually certified along this route until 1940.
1939: SR 18 alignment removed from SR 2 alignment west of Hicksville.
1939: Route extended east to Lost Nation Road in Willoughby.
1941: SR 2 from West 6th to East 9th moved from Lakeside Avenue to the Lakefront Highway, later called the Cleveland Memorial Shoreway. Lakeside certified as SR 2 temporary.
1962: Extended east to SR 283 in Painesville; Euclid-to-Painesville alignment upgraded to freeway.
1967: Route extended to its current eastern terminus at US 20 in Painesville Township
1973–1975: OH 2 Alt is deleted as discontinuous sections of Route 2 are moved from US 6 to I-90.
1977: From SR 83 to Rocky River upgraded to freeway and dually certified with I-90.
August 30, 1990: From Huron to Ceylon upgraded to freeway.

Major intersections

Auxiliary routes

SR 2 Temporary 

State Route 2 temporary was a designation that ran from West 6th to East 9th along Lakeside ave. in downtown Cleveland. The designation was added when the final alignments of SR 2 were moved to the then new Lakeside Highway, later referred to as the Cleveland Memorial Shoreway. The route's eastern terminus was moved to Public Square via Ontario St. in 1957.

SR 2C

State Route 2C is an unsigned connecting road that runs from State Route 163 to State Route 2 and State Route 53 near Port Clinton in Ottawa County, Ohio. State Route 2C was constructed as an access road for the SR 2–SR 163 interchange.

SR 2D

State Route 2D is part of a couplet in Wauseon, Ohio that is signed as State Route 2. SR 2D is signed as SR 2 westbound, while SR 2 is signed as SR 2 eastbound, (except west of East Elm Street, where SR 2D meets SR 2 at its western terminus). The route ends at the corner of East Linfoot Street and North Shoop Avenue.

Cultural references
In the 2014 film Captain America: The Winter Soldier, the Cleveland Memorial Shoreway is used to depict a freeway in Washington, D.C.

Gallery

References

External links

002
Transportation in Defiance County, Ohio
Transportation in Williams County, Ohio
Transportation in Fulton County, Ohio
Transportation in Lucas County, Ohio
Transportation in Ottawa County, Ohio
Transportation in Erie County, Ohio
Transportation in Lorain County, Ohio
Transportation in Cuyahoga County, Ohio
Transportation in Lake County, Ohio
Transportation in Toledo, Ohio
Transportation in Cleveland
U.S. Route 6
U.S. Route 20